Lars Andersson (born 7 August 1956) is a Swedish equestrian. He competed in two events at the 1988 Summer Olympics.

He is currently active as international dressage judge. He was promoted to 5* level in 2020, which allows him to judge at European and World Championships and at the Olympic Games.

References

External links
 

1956 births
Living people
Swedish male equestrians
Olympic equestrians of Sweden
Equestrians at the 1988 Summer Olympics
Sportspeople from Malmö